Marc Dal Hende (born 6 November 1990) is a Danish professional footballer who plays for Danish Superliga club SønderjyskE.

Career
On 1 December 2009, Dal Hende signed a one-and-a-half year contract with Viborg FF after having played for the FC Copenhagen reserve team in the Danish third tier. His contract was not renewed, however, and he signed with AB one a one-year deal in the summer of 2011. In June 2013, Dal Hende signed a three-year contract with FC Vestsjælland who had just been promoted to the Danish Superliga. He scored his first goal for FCV on 15 September 2013 against Randers FC. On 31 August 2015, Dal Hende signed a two-year contract with SønderjyskE.

The first rumors of Dal Hende joining FC Midtjylland began during the summer of 2016, but the deal was finalized roughly half a year later, on 29 January 2017. He won two Danish Superliga trophies and a Danish Cup while at Midtjylland, amassing 81 total appearances in which he scored an impressive 21 goals from his position as left back.

On 9 August 2020, Dal Hende returned to SønderjyskE, signing a three-year contract with the club from Haderslev.

Honours
Midtjylland
 Danish Superliga:  2017–18, 2019–20
 Danish Cup:  2018–19

References

External links
Profile at EliteProspects.com

1990 births
Living people
Danish men's footballers
Danish Superliga players
Danish 1st Division players
Boldklubben af 1893 players
Kjøbenhavns Boldklub players
FC Vestsjælland players
Akademisk Boldklub players
Viborg FF players
SønderjyskE Fodbold players
FC Midtjylland players
Association football defenders
People from Dragør Municipality
Sportspeople from the Capital Region of Denmark